Isle of Wight/Sandown Airport  is an unlicensed aerodrome located  west of Sandown, Isle of Wight, England. It is close to the village of Lake.

Isle of Wight Sandown Aerodrome formerly had a CAA Ordinary Licence (Number P883) that allows flights for the public transport of passengers or for flying instruction as authorised by the licensee (Isle of Wight Aviation Limited).

Fire damage and recovery
On 8 October 2006 at 13:15 GMT, a major fire started in a hangar containing highly flammable materials.

One year later, during the early hours of 31 December 2007, a fire started in the kitchen of the Aviator Restaurant.  This destroyed most of the newly built clubhouse and restaurant. It was thought at first that arson may have been the cause of the fire, but investigation found that it had been caused by two gas cylinders in the kitchen.

Following a major decline in revenue as a result of the fire, the airport was sold to a London property developer, who intended to build a holiday camp on the site.  Plans to build on the site were denied.

In May 2013 the airport was purchased by two aviation enthusiasts who planned to promote the airfield. Landing fees were reduced and a supply of aviation fuel introduced. 

Sandown started to gain popularity after owner, Danial Subhani, started to "revamp" the airfield. The addition of an artificial grass runway allowed year-round operation, and a new airfield bistro featuring a pizza oven proved popular with pilots and visitors alike. 

In 2021, aviation flight planning app Sky Demon introduced a feature to rank pilots favourite airfields, in which Sandown ranked first.

References

Airports in England
Transport on the Isle of Wight
Airports in South East England
Buildings and structures on the Isle of Wight
Sandown